Gal Cohen Groumi (born 22 April 2002) is an Israeli swimmer. He competed in the men's 4 × 200 metre freestyle relay, 200 IM, 100 Fly and 4 × 100 MIX IM relay where the team with Gal made the finals and touched 8th overall in it at the 2020 Summer Olympics.

Cohen Groumi was born in Hod HaSharon, Israel, to a family of Jewish background. His uncle is Israeli former Olympic swimmer Eran (Cohen) Groumi.

References

External links
 
 

2002 births
Living people
Competitors at the 2022 Maccabiah Games
Israeli male swimmers
Israeli male freestyle swimmers
Olympic swimmers of Israel
Swimmers at the 2020 Summer Olympics
Place of birth missing (living people)
Swimmers at the 2018 Summer Youth Olympics
People from Hod HaSharon
Israeli Jews
Jewish swimmers